WFBU-LP is a Christian radio station licensed to Graceville, Florida, broadcasting on 94.7 MHz FM.  The station is owned and operated by the Baptist College of Florida.

References

External links
WFBU's official website
 

FBU-LP
FBU-LP
Moody Radio affiliate stations
FBU-LP